Antioch Cantemir may refer to either of:

 Antioch Cantemir, Prince of Moldavia (d. 1726)
 Antioch Cantemir, Prince of Russia (d. 1744), his nephew